Grimm Grimm is a solo project of London-based musician, recording artist and producer Koichi Yamanoha. He has released three solo albums, and six singles on independent labels since 2014.

Grimm Grimm has collaborated with other artists, including Lætitia Sadier, Le Volume Courbe, Daisy Dickinson, Bo Ningen, Victor Herrero, Killer-Bong and Klein.

History
Yamanoha is originally from Tokyo, Japan and is the former frontman of psychedelic-punk group, Screaming Tea Party (2006-2010) in London. The band has released 2 EPs through Stolen Recordings in the United Kingdom, and disbanded in October 2010. Yamanoha's first solo performance was at the underground music event, Krautorock Karaoke at the George Tavern in 2013.

His debut Grimm Grimm single, "Kazega Fuitara Sayonara / Tell the Truth", was released in late 2014 via Kevin Shields (of My Bloody Valentine) and Charlotte Marionneau (aka Le Volume Courbe)'s Pickpocket Records label in collaboration with Honest Jon's. His debut album, Hazy Eyes Maybe, was released on ATP Recordings in 2015 and tracks from the album were used on the soundtrack for the documentary film Uncle Howard (2016) featuring William S. Burroughs and directed and produced by Aaron Brookner / Jim Jarmusch. His second album, Cliffhanger, was released by Some Other Planet in partnership with Kartel Music Group in June 2018.

Yamanoha announced the release of his third studio album, Ginormous, on 28 February 2020 on Tip Top Recordings / Magniph. The album was mixed and co-produced by Marta Salogni and featured Paz Maddio and Lætitia Sadier. Grimm Grimm and his ensemble appeared on BBC 6 Music on 19 February 2020 where they were interviewed by Mark Riley and played three songs live in session. Later that evening they were invited by Gideon Coe to play a track on his show to celebrate the release of Ginormous.

Grimm Grimm has toured with and supported artists such as Cate Le Bon, Simon Finn, Dinosaur Jr, Wire and The Undertones. He has also played multiple music festivals around the world including Le Guess Who? in Utrecht, Netherlands, Green Man Festival in Wales, Sonic Festival in Belgium and All Tomorrow's Parties (festival) in England.

Musical style
Grimm Grimm's music has been described by Folk Radio UK as "Otherworldly forays into baroque folk, futurist lyricism and electroacoustic oddities" The Quietus described his 2020 album, Ginormous, as "Accented with percussion that comes in small clicks and creaks, metronomic rhythms, clacking, cranking sounds like wind-up gears, which sometimes stand in for more conventional drumming, or, as on 'Kyowa Amenohidesu', can create a halting, glitchy tempo."Clash also gave his album "Hazy Eyes Maybe" 8/10 - "On the surface, 'Hazy Eyes Maybe' might seem a simple, acoustic album, but scrape beneath the surface and there lies intricately crafted layers of mournful, morphing, melancholic hooks".

Discography

Albums
Hazy Eyes Maybe (ATP Recordings / P-Vine Records, 2015)
Cliffhanger (Some Other Planet, / Hostess Entertainment, 2018)
Ginormous (Tip Top Recordings/ Magniph, 2020)

EP

Recalling (Takuroku, 2021)

Singles
Kazega Fuitara Sayonara / Tell The Truth - 7" Vinyl (Pickpocket Records, 2014)
Hazy Eyes Maybe / Knowing - 7" Vinyl (ATP Recordings / P-Vine Records, 2015)
Take Me Down To Coney Island / Ballad of Cell Membrane (Some Other Planet / Hostess Entertainment, 2018)
Ghost of Madame Legros (Tip Top Recordings / Magniph, 2019)
Something in Your Way (Tip Top Recordings / Magniph, 2019)
We've Never Been This Far Before (Tip Top Recordings / Magniph, 2020)

Split release
 w/Tapers, CD (So I Buried, 2014)

Remix
Kazega Fuitara Sayonara Remixes: Remixed by Klein / Killer-Bong - 7" Vinyl (birdFriend, 2019)

Compilation
 Rough Trade Counter Culture 15 CD (Rough Trade, 2015)

References

External links
 Official homepage
 Instagram
 Facebook

Living people
Singers from London
Japanese male singers
British experimental musicians
Experimental pop musicians
Baroque pop musicians
English-language singers from Japan
21st-century Japanese artists
21st-century Japanese singers
Musicians from Tokyo
Year of birth missing (living people)
21st-century British male singers
ATP Recordings artists
P-Vine Records artists